The 1944–45 SK Rapid Wien season was the 47th season in club history.

Squad

Squad and statistics

Squad statistics

Fixtures and results

Gauliga

The competition was abandoned due to war. The games played are usually not counted in official statistics.

Tschammerpokal

References

1944-45 Rapid Wien Season
Rapid